Diari may refer to:

The Soninke word for griot
Diari, Guinea